The 1904–05 Scottish Cup was the 32nd season of Scotland's most prestigious football knockout competition. The Cup was won by Third Lanark when they beat Rangers 3-1 in a replay.

Calendar

First round

First round replay

Second round

Game Abandoned

Second round replay

Quarter-final

Quarter-final replay

Semi-finals

Final

Final replay

Teams

See also
1904–05 in Scottish football

References

RSSF Scottish Cup 04-05

Scottish Cup seasons
Cup
1904–05 domestic association football cups